Ameerega ignipedis is a species of poison frog found in central Peru. It is similar to Ameerega petersi, but differs from the latter in call and size, by having allopatric distributions, and by not being close relatives (Bayesian phylogeny). It is also similar in appearance to A. pongoensis, although the latter doesn't possess flash marks above its groin and has a different call. It is also related to A. bassleri, a much larger species which usually possesses a yellow or orange dorsum.

References

ignipedis
Amphibians of Peru
Amphibians described in 2009